Irit Grenchel is an Israeli international lawn bowler.

Bowls career
Grenchel was selected as part of the five woman team by Israel for the 2020 World Outdoor Bowls Championship Previously she had represented Israel at two more World Championships; the 2004 World Outdoor Bowls Championship and the 2008 World Outdoor Bowls Championship.

She won a triples silver medal (with Tami Kamzel and Naomi Fix), at the 2005 Atlantic Bowls Championships. Two years later she won a second medal at the Championships; this time it was a pairs bronze with Ruthie Gilor at the 2007 event in Ayr, Scotland.

References

Israeli female bowls players
Living people
Year of birth missing (living people)